is a diary of 20th-century Indian philosopher Jiddu Krishnamurti (18951986). Written during , it was first published in book form in 1976; an expanded edition was published in 2003. The work, which includes first hand accounts of persistent, unusual physical experiences and states of consciousness, has been called "a remarkable mystical document" in press reports; an authorized Krishnamurti biographer described it as containing "the whole essence" of his philosophy.

About the work

Krishnamurti's first entry in this handwritten journal, quoted above in its entirety, is dated  with the location given as New York City. He continued writing almost daily for nine months while at various locales; there are about 200 entries in total, almost all of them between one and two print pages in length. The last entry is dated  at 

The diary portrays Krishnamurti's world from the inside; according to a commentator, it provides a "panorama of the landscape of Krishnamurti's daily consciousness. As is the case with other Krishnamurti works, the entries often include his impressions of nature, individuals and society, the descriptions of which have a "poetic quality" according to 

In the time period covered by the diary, similar events were witnessed by other associates while Krishnamurti was in Switzerland in the summer of 1961; the diary and the events or states described, again reputedly perceived by others, continued upon his arrival to India in late autumn of the same  

Krishnamurti biographer Mary Lutyens wrote in the foreword to the original edition (published 1976), "In this unique daily record we have what may be called the well-spring of Krishnamurti's teaching. The whole essence of his teaching is here, arising from its natural source. Elsewhere, she observes, "apart from its content, it is an extraordinary manuscript,  without a single erasure. She devoted a chapter to this book in the second volume of her authorized biography of Krishnamurti, The Years of Fulfillment (published 1983). In it she mentions objections raised against the diary's publication by Krishnamurti associates who had read the manuscript and thought it presented a picture of Krishnamurti at odds with his public pronouncements; his responses to these objections are 

At the time, Krishnamurti was associated with the Theosophical Society and the related World Teacher Project. The existence and history of these experiences had remained unknown outside of the Theosophical Society leadership and Krishnamurti's circle of close associates and 

Roland Vernon, another of his biographers, states that previous attempts (by others), at revealing details from his past, including these reputed experiences, were suppressed by Krishnamurti. According to Vernon, Krishnamurti "believed, with good reason, that the sensationalism of his early story would cloud the public's perception of his  current work". However, Krishnamurti often hinted at -like states in later talks and discussions; he was more expansive on the subject with close associates, also stating that the experience of  continued as he was nearing 

Around the time of the diary's publication more than fourteen years after the final entry Krishnamurti stated, "I did not write it for  I have attempted to put into words the actual pain and sensation which goes with the heightened

Publication history

The manuscript was entangled in personal and legal disputes between Krishnamurti and D. Rajagopal, Krishnamurti's erstwhile editor and business manager. An agreement in 1974 regarding this and other Krishnamurti materials allowed eventual publication, and the first edition appeared in  via longtime Krishnamurti publishers Gollancz in the United Kingdom and Harper & Row in the United States .

The front and back covers of both impressions feature the same set of contemporary photographs of Krishnamurti. After the Foreword by Lutyens there is a table of contents labeled "Itinerary", listing the places the diary was kept. Copyright was held by the Krishnamurti Foundation Trust (KFT), a UK-based organization. A paperback edition was first published in the US by Harper's Perennial Library imprint in  

This so-called  was published by Krishnamurti Publications, the official publisher and distributor of Krishnamurti's works. This impression includes facsimiles of original diary pages and an additional, edition-specific foreword. It features a photograph similar to the first edition's on the front cover (Krishnamurti alone in a nature setting); a 1935 portrait of his by Edward Weston is on the back cover. This edition's copyright was again registered to the KFT.

The work was first published in digital media in 2008, as a Kindle e-book release of the expanded edition .

An unabridged audiobook edition narrated by Anthony Wren was published in 2017 by Blackstone Audio as a downloadable audio file ; a CD audio version of the audiobook, published by Made for Success, was released in the US in  via

Original edition

Select editions

Reception
The Library Journal stated in review,  insights are, as always, written in plain, nonsectarian language, and give perhaps the best picture we have today of the life of the spirit outside a strictly religious context. Publishers Weekly called the work a "luminous diary", and characterized Krishnamurti's teaching as "austere, in a sense  

Kirkus Reviews described it as  approachable, more intimate than Krishnamurti's didactic writings, this will  to all readers with a feeling for the mystery of existence"; however, London's Observer thought it better suited to those already familiar with Krishnamurti's life and 

Krishnamurti was interviewed about the work by Gerald Priestland for the BBC Radio 4 program Chapter and Verse, which reviewed books of a religious or spiritual nature; the interview and book review was broadcast on the evening of 

The Guardian (London) carried a sympathetic report about the book in  the article was not exclusively focused on the Notebook, also describing Krishnamurti's life and 

The reputed inner experiences as described in the diary and in Lutyens' biography aroused the interest of Krishnamurti's audiences. After their publication he was questioned by his listeners on the subject; he was generally dismissive of the importance of -related events, stating that all discussion of mystical experiences was trivial, and, although he continued alluding to -like states, he again avoided any 

The book continued to attract attention, and favorable mentions, in the following decades. In its obituary of Krishnamurti, The Times (London), described it as "a remarkable mystical document", while in 2006 the work was cited in a conference paper as  the most extensive documentation to date of a mystic's inner thoughts, perceptions, and

Other diaries
Following this diary's original publication, two other diaries of his were published in book form: Krishnamurti's Journal in 1982, and Krishnamurti to Himself in

See also
 Jiddu Krishnamurti bibliography

Notes

References

 

 

 

 

 

 

 .

 .

 .

 .

 .

 .

 

 

  .

 

 

 

  

 .

 

 

 

 

 
 

1976 non-fiction books
Books by Jiddu Krishnamurti
Diaries
Harper & Row books
Philosophy books
Victor Gollancz Ltd books